Lajos Pálmai (1866–1937) was a Hungarian politician, who served as Minister of Justice in the Counter-revolutionary Government of Arad during the Hungarian Soviet Republic. Later he worked as a notary public for the Diet of Hungary between 1926 and 1936.

References
 Magyar Életrajzi Lexikon

1866 births
1937 deaths
Jewish Hungarian politicians
Justice ministers of Hungary